Phineas Bury (b 1902) was the Dean of Cloyne from 1957 to 1973.

He was educated at Christ's College, Cambridge and St Augustine's College, Canterbury; and ordained in 1931. After a curacy at Far Headingley he was the Chaplain at Buenos Aires then Kamptee. He was Rector of Castletownroche then Ballycotton until his appointment as Dean.

References

1902 births
Alumni of Christ's College, Cambridge
Alumni of St Augustine's College, Canterbury
Irish Anglicans
Deans of Cloyne
Year of death missing